Detvianska Huta (Mikulášova Huta, 1880 Mikulássowá) is a village and municipality in Detva District, in the Banská Bystrica Region of central Slovakia.

History 
It arose in the late 18th century by a merge of villages Komárno and Bratkovica and  glasswork settlement (Detvianska Huta literally means "Detva (Glass) Works"). Glassworks stopped its production at the end of 19th century and from 1920 the village bears its present name.

Famous people 
Milan Kolibiar, mathematician

Genealogical resources 

The records for genealogical research are available at the state archive "Statny Archiv in Banska Bystrica, Slovakia"

 Roman Catholic church records (births/marriages/deaths): 1763–1934 (parish A)

See also 
 List of municipalities and towns in Slovakia

References

External links 
Official homepage
http://www.e-obce.sk/obec/detvianskahuta/detvianska-huta.html
Surnames of living people in Detvianska Huta

Villages and municipalities in Detva District